Anton Lukashin (born 21 February 1995) is a Belarusian professional football player who plays for Sputnik Rechitsa.

References

External links

Profile at teams.by

1995 births
Living people
Belarusian footballers
Association football forwards
FC Neman Grodno players
FC Lida players
FC Granit Mikashevichi players
FC Sputnik Rechitsa players